Peter H. Thomas (born September 14, 1938) is a Canadian entrepreneur, investor, author, public speaker, and philanthropist. Thomas was the founding partner and chairman of  Century 21 Real Estate Canada Ltd and Samoth Capital Corporation (now known as Sterling Centrecorp Inc.). He is the founder and chairman of Thomas Pride International and its affiliates, including Thomas Franchise Solutions as well as LifePilot.

Career 

Before becoming an entrepreneur, Thomas served with the Royal Canadian Army Service Corps for seven years, from 1954 to 1961. The first two years were with the RCASE Apprentice Training Company and the last five years with the HQ of the First Canadian Infantry Brigade at Camp Borden, Ontario. He served one year at Camp Rafah, Egypt at the Suez Canal as a member of the Royal Canadian Dragoons Reconnaissance Squadron.

Thomas founded Century 21 Real Estate Canada Ltd in 1976. Thomas served as chairman until he sold his rights in 1987, when the company had $9 billion in annual sales and employed over 8000 sales representatives with over 400 franchises, making it the largest real estate network in the country at that time.

In 1984, Thomas founded Samoth Capital Corporation (SCC), a North American real estate financial services company now known as Sterling Centrecorp Inc. He served as chairman and chief executive officer for the publicly traded Toronto Stock Exchange Company from 1984 to 2001.

In 2000, Thomas moved to Scottsdale, Arizona, and led the development of the Four Seasons Resort and Hotel, a project which was facilitated through Thomas Pride International. 

Thomas Pride International, a parent company of many affiliates, is a private investment and financing firm.

In 2011, Thomas founded and is chairman of Thomas Franchise Solutions (TFS), a private equity firm that specializes by investing in and developing businesses in North America that have franchising as their core expansion strategy.  TFS made its first portfolio investment into Dogtopia, a dog daycare, boarding and grooming franchise in the fall of 2013. In the eight short years since his acquisition, Dogtopia grew from 20 franchises to 145 with an additional 161 in the pipeline. Peter is also an investor in the Canadian Dogtopia region, the Seattle Dogtopia region and is a co-owner of Dogtopia of Highland Ranch in Colorado.  Peter recently stepped down as Chairman of Dogtopia in the US and is now Chairman Emeritus. https://www.dogtopia.com/ https://www.dogtopiafoundationca.org/
 
Thomas Pride, his private holding company, is still actively involved in the real estate market.  They provide bridge financing for developers to acquire multi-unit apartments and also acquire multi-family apartment projects built in the 70’s and 80’s that are over 100 units. They renovate the apartments and put them back on the market. https://www.thomaspride.com/
 
Another recent venture is Urban Communities with a mission to improve people’s lives through the development and redevelopment of sustainable communities, creating value for residents, stakeholders, and society.  They are developers, investors, managers and visionaries and call this “Profit with Purpose”. https://www.urban-communities.com/

Philanthropy 

Thomas is the chairman of the Thomas Foundation, a Canadian public foundation which supports charities catering to children, mental health, and education in Canada. Charities supported by the foundation include the Boys and Girls Club of Greater Vancouver, Dogtopia Foundation, Freedoms Door, Coast Mental Health Foundation, Create Change, Power to Be, and others.

In 2000, Thomas started the Todd Thomas Foundation “To help raise awareness of the magnitude of mental illness and the effect it has on individuals as well as our society, to assist in decreasing the stigma associated with it, and to support research for effective treatments". This charity is a component fund within the structure of the Arizona Community Foundation.

In 2002, Thomas founded LifePilot, a not-for-profit organization that teaches values-based living and leadership workshops to students, prisoners, and individuals.

In 2008 the Todd Thomas Institute for Values-Based Leadership at Royal Roads University, now known as the Institute for Values-Based Leadership at Royal Roads, was seed-funded through a donation from Thomas. Named after his late son Todd, the school was founded to "sponsor research, visiting professorships, and scholarships". Named after his late son Todd, the Institute for Values Based leadership is an addition to the leadership program at Royal Roads.

The Todd Thomas Foundation continues to support various charities including the Be Kind People’s Project, the Grace Campbell Foundation, Southwest Autism Research and Resource Center (SAARC), GO2 Foundation for Lung Cancer, Harvest Compassion Center and others.

Entrepreneurship contributions 

Thomas was one of the founding members of the Entrepreneurs Organization and served on its board for 20 years. He has been recognized as the chairman emeritus of the EO advisory board.

Thomas has been a judge at the EO Global Student Entrepreneur Awards (GSEA) for the past ten years in both Canada and the United States. In 2020 he became Chairman of the GSEA’s in Canada and continues to contribute to its success.  Thomas continues to serve as one of the founders of L3.

Thomas has been actively involved in Young Presidents Organization (YPO) and World Presidents Organization (WPO), and served as a member of the WPO Board.

Government service 

Past chairman of the British Columbia Housing Commission
Past chairman of the British Columbia Building Corporation
Past chairman of the British Columbia Government Privatization Review Committee
Past board member of the British Columbia Pavilion Corporation
Past director and chairman of the fund-raising committee for St. Michael's University School

Select awards 
2011 Doctor of Laws, honoris causa, Royal Roads University, Victoria, British Columbia, Canada
2010 Adult Caring Award Winner
2008 Honor of EO trophy name: The Thomas Trimble Cup honoring Peter Thomas and Bill Trimble as EO's Canadian Pioneers
2007 Collegiate Entrepreneurs' Organization (CEO) Lifetime Achievement Award
2007 Introduction into the CEO Hall of Fame, Chicago
2001 Golden Heart Award for Leader of Distinction, Arizona Women Magazine
1998 Ernst & Young Entrepreneur of the Year Award, Pacific Region
1996 Honor of EO award initiation: The Peter H. Thomas Award of Merit - presented yearly to a YPO or WPO member who is considered the most valuable mentor to EO.

Publications 
Thomas, Peter H. (1977). The Peter Thomas Sales Course. Re-mastered for CD in 2008.
Thomas, Peter H. (1984). Windows of Opportunity: 21 Steps to Successful Selling. Key Porter Books. 
Thomas, Peter H. (1991). Never Fight with a Pig: A Survival Guide for Entrepreneurs. MacMillan Canada. 
Thomas, Peter H. (2005). LifeManual: A Proven Formula to Live the Life You Desire. LifePilot. 
Thomas, Peter H. (2009). Be Great – The Five Foundations of an Extraordinary Life In Business and Beyond. Jon Wiley & Sons Canada, Ltd. 
Thomas, Peter H. & Jeary, Tony (2014).  Business Ground Rules.  Carpenter's Son Publishing.

References 

2020 Portfolio link: https://aspioneer.com/thomas-pride-international-at-82-real-estate-giant-moves-into-the-doghouse/

1938 births
Living people
Canadian businesspeople
Canadian finance and investment writers
Royal Canadian Dragoons soldiers